Mooresville is an unincorporated community in Ross County, in the U.S. state of Ohio.

History
The community has the name of the Moore family, first settlers at the town site. A post office called Mooresville was established in 1857, and discontinued in 1858. The post office later was known as Halltown. The Halltown post office operated from 1889 until 1902.

References

Unincorporated communities in Ross County, Ohio
1857 establishments in Ohio
Populated places established in 1857
Unincorporated communities in Ohio